Gentianella splendens is a species of plant in the family Gentianaceae. It is endemic to Ecuador.  Its natural habitats are subtropical or tropical swamps and subtropical or tropical high-altitude shrubland.

References

splendens
Endemic flora of Ecuador
Least concern plants
Taxonomy articles created by Polbot